Dome is a German graffiti artist.

Creativity and Exhibitions 
In 1995, Christian Krämer began to study spray painting. By the 2000s he took part in exhibitions. In the beginning of his artistic career Krämer used a large color palette, but since 2012 his work has been monochrome. Krämer's style has been classified as avant-garde, as he combines realistic and surreal elements.

Germany 

2001

 Die Faerberei in Munich; title of the exhibition: "Ostasinn"

2002

 Gotec House of culture in Karlsruhe; title of the exhibition: "X – flammable"

2003

 Die Faerberei in Munich; title of the exhibition: " Ostasinn"

2004

 Reithalle in Ingolstadt; title of the exhibition: "Graffiti war Gestern" 
 Baden Art society in Karlsruhe; title of the exhibition: "Member exhibition"

2005

 Baden Art society in Karlsruhe; title of the exhibition: "Member exhibition"

2006

 Wildwuchs Gallery in Freiburg; title of the exhibition: "Opening" 
 Färberei in Munich; title of the exhibition: "Kunst Kultur Kongress" 
 Gotec House of culture in Karlsruhe; title of the exhibition: "Urban Signs"

2007

 Gotec House of culture in Karlsruhe; title of the exhibition: "Urban Signs 2" 
 Carhartt Gallery in Weil am Rhein; title of the exhibition: "Carhartt Gallery" 
 Baden Art society in Karlsruhe; title of the exhibition: "Member exhibition"

2008

 Carhartt Gallery in Weil am Rhein; title of the exhibition: "Carhartt Gallery" 
 Gotec House of culture in Karlsruhe; title of the exhibition: "Urban Signs 3" 
 Carhartt Gallery in Weil am Rhein; title of the exhibition: "Exhibition for Urban Arts" 
 Intoxicated Demons Gallery in Berlin; title of the exhibition: "Addicted to details" 
 Gallery im Schlachthaus in Karlsruhe; title of the exhibition: "Solo show" 
 Baden Art society in Karlsruhe; title of the exhibition: "Member exhibition"

2009

 Gotec House of culture in Karlsruhe; title of the exhibition: "Urban Signs 4" 
 SAP in Walldorf; title of the exhibition: "Street Art Painting" 
 Intoxicated Demons Gallery in Berlin; title of the exhibition: "Kunst im Tresor" 
 Nuthouse Gallery in Munich; title of the exhibition: "Stroke 01" 
 Baden Art society in Karlsruhe; title of the exhibition: "Member exhibition"

2010

 Aliseo Art Projects in Gengenbach; title of the exhibition: "Zerfall und Zukunft" 
 SNNC in Wanderausstellung; title of the exhibition: "Schwarz auf Weiss" 
 Nuthouse Gallery in Munich; title of the exhibition: "Stroke 02" 
 Gallery X Hoch 4 in Ingolstadt; title of the exhibition: "Das andere Echt"

2011

 Gallery Rheinstrasse in Karlsruhe; title of the exhibition: "Summer exhibition" 
 Art society Freiburg in Freiburg; title of the exhibition: "New contemporary art" 
 Gallery Rheinstrasse in Karlsruhe; title of the exhibition: "Kunst schenken"

2012

 Art society Schopfheim in Schopfheim; title of the exhibition: "Nachtgestalten" 
 City Gallery in Saarbrücken; title of the exhibition: "Urban Art Show"

2014

 Urban Art Gallery in Stuttgart; title of the exhibition: "Urban playground"

Italy 
2008

 Museo Civico in Bassano del Grappa; title of the exhibition: " Infart 3" 
 Atrion in Milano; title of the exhibition: " Urban Painting "

2010

 Urban Painting Gallery in Milano; title of the exhibition: "Summer Show"
 Open Lab Gallery in Genova; title of the exhibition: "Great stuff" 
 Urban Painting Gallery in Milano; title of the exhibition: " Milano Design Week "

2011

 Castello Visconteo in Visconteo; title of the exhibition: "Urban Painting"

2012

 Urban Painting Gallery in Carugate; title of the exhibition: " Urban Painting Night "

Austria 

2009

 Museumsquartier in Wien; title of the exhibition: "Streetartpassage"

Denmark 
2009

 Gallery Jenzen in Aalborg; title of the exhibition: "Urban Art"

Israel 
2013

 STA Gallery in Tel Aviv; title of the exhibition: "Solo Exhibition"

United States 
2013

 Wynwood in Miami; title of the exhibition: "Shoot for the moon "

Festivals and events 
2013

 Street Art Doping (Warsaw, Poland)
 Sketchmate (Chieri, Italy)
 Wynwood Embassy (Miami, USA)

See also 
 Street art
 List of street artists

References

External links 
 

1975 births
Living people
German graffiti artists